The Medal of Freedom was a decoration established by President Harry S. Truman to honor civilians whose actions aided in the war efforts of the United States and its allies during and beyond World War II. It was intended to be awarded by the secretary of state, the secretary of war, or the secretary of the navy, but presidents Dwight D. Eisenhower and John F. Kennedy also authorized awards. The first woman and American citizen to receive it was Anna M. Rosenberg by Robert P. Patterson on the recommendation of Eisenhower.

Description
The medal is a bronze disc whose obverse features the profile of the Statue of Freedom of the US Capitol Building, with the word "FREEDOM" in capital letters in an arc at the bottom of the disc. The reverse features the Liberty Bell surrounded by the words "UNITED STATES OF AMERICA" in capital letters. The medal is suspended on a red ribbon with four thin white stripes. The original Executive Order 9586 establishing the medal specified "No more than one Medal of Freedom shall be awarded to any one person, but for a subsequent act or service justifying such an award a suitable device may be awarded to be worn with the medal" and bronze, silver, and gold palm devices were produced and awarded. There is no evidence of U.S. citizens having received these palm devices, whereas some non-U.S. citizens did receive them (e.g. Micheline "Michou" Dumon and Nancy Wake), and the devices have been interpreted as signifying degrees of the award.

Ribbons
 Without palm	
 With bronze palm	
 With silver palm	
 With gold palm

See also
Presidential Medal of Freedom
Awards and decorations of the United States government

References

External links 

Civil awards and decorations of the United States
Awards established in 1945
1945 establishments in the United States
 
1961 disestablishments
Presidency of Harry S. Truman